Trans World Airlines Flight 800 (TWA800) was a Boeing 747-100 that exploded and crashed into the Atlantic Ocean near East Moriches, New York, on July 17, 1996, at about 8:31pm. EDT, 12 minutes after takeoff from John F. Kennedy International Airport, on a scheduled international passenger flight to Rome, with a stopover in Paris. All 230 people on board died in the crash; it is the third-deadliest aviation accident in U.S. history. Accident investigators from the National Transportation Safety Board (NTSB) traveled to the scene, arriving the following morning amid speculation that a terrorist attack was the cause of the crash. Consequently, the Federal Bureau of Investigation (FBI) and New York Police Department Joint Terrorism Task Force (JTTF) initiated a parallel criminal investigation. Sixteen months later, the JTTF announced that no evidence of a criminal act had been found and closed its active investigation.

The four-year NTSB investigation concluded with the approval of the Aircraft Accident Report on August 23, 2000, ending the most extensive, complex and costly air disaster investigation in U.S. history at that time. The report's conclusion was that the probable cause of the accident was explosion of flammable fuel vapors in the center fuel tank. Although it could not be determined with certainty, the likely ignition source was a short circuit. Problems with the aircraft's wiring were found, including evidence of arcing in the fuel quantity indication system (FQIS) wiring that enters the tank. The FQIS on Flight 800 is known to have been malfunctioning; the captain remarked on "crazy" readings from the system about 2 minutes and 30 seconds before the aircraft exploded. As a result of the investigation, new requirements were developed for aircraft to prevent future fuel tank explosions.

Accident flight

The accident airplane, registration N93119 (a Boeing 747-131), was manufactured by Boeing in July 1971; it had been ordered by Eastern Air Lines, but after Eastern cancelled its 747 orders, the plane was purchased new by Trans World Airlines.
The aircraft had completed 16,869 flights with 93,303 hours of operation and was powered by four Pratt & Whitney JT9D-7AH turbofan engines. On the day of the accident, the airplane departed from Ellinikon International Airport in Athens, Greece, as TWA Flight 881 and arrived at John F. Kennedy International Airport (JFK) about 4:38 pm. The aircraft was refueled, and a crew change was made; the new flight crew consisted of 58-year-old Captain Ralph G. Kevorkian (who had flown for TWA for 31 years and the U.S. Air Force for 9 years), 57-year-old Captain/Check Airman Steven E. Snyder (who had flown for TWA for 32 years), and 63-year-old Flight Engineer/Check Airman Richard G. Campbell Jr. (who had flown for TWA for 30 years and the U.S. Air Force for 12 years), as well as 25-year-old flight engineer trainee Oliver Krick (who previously served as a business pilot for 4 years), who had flown for TWA for 26 days and was starting the sixth leg of his initial operating experience training.

The ground-maintenance crew locked out the thrust reverser for engine #3 (treated as a minimum equipment list item) because of technical problems with the thrust reverser sensors during the landing of TWA 881 at JFK, prior to Flight 800's departure. Additionally, severed cables for the engine #3 thrust reverser were replaced. During refueling of the aircraft, the volumetric shutoff (VSO) control was believed to have been triggered before the tanks were full. To continue the pressure fueling, a TWA mechanic overrode the automatic VSO by pulling the volumetric fuse and an overflow circuit breaker. Maintenance records indicate that the aircraft had numerous VSO-related maintenance writeups in the weeks before the accident.

TWA 800 was scheduled to depart JFK for Charles de Gaulle Airport around 7:00 pm, but the flight was delayed until 8:02 pm by a disabled piece of ground equipment and a passenger/baggage mismatch. After the owner of the baggage in question was confirmed to be on board, the flight crew prepared for departure, and the aircraft pushed back from Gate 27 at the TWA Flight Center. The flight crew started the engines at 8:04 pm. However, because of the previous maintenance undertaken on engine #3, the flight crew only started engines #1, #2, and #4. Engine #3 was started 10 minutes later at 8:14 pm. Taxi and takeoff proceeded uneventfully.
 TWA 800 then received a series of heading changes and generally increasing altitude assignments as it climbed to its intended cruising altitude. Weather in the area was light winds with scattered clouds, with dusk lighting conditions. The last recorded radar transponder return from the airplane was recorded by the Federal Aviation Administration (FAA) radar site at Trevose, Pennsylvania, at 8:31:12 pm.

Subsequently, many air traffic control facilities in the New York/Long Island area received reports of an explosion from other pilots operating in the area. Many witnesses in the vicinity of the crash stated that they saw or heard explosions, accompanied by a large fireball or fireballs over the ocean, and observed debris, some of which was burning while falling into the water.
Various civilian, military, and police vessels reached the crash site and searched for survivors within minutes of the initial water impact, but found none, making TWA 800 the second-deadliest aircraft accident in United States history at that time.

Passengers and crew 

On board TWA 800 were 230 people, including 18 crew and 20 off-duty employees, most of whom were crew meant to cover the Paris-Rome leg of the flight. Seventeen of the 18 crew members and 152 of the passengers were Americans; the remaining crew member was Italian, while the remaining passengers were of various other nationalities. Notable passengers included:

 Michel Breistroff, French ice hockey player
 Marcel Dadi, French guitarist
 Lawrence Harris, American fashion photographer
 David Hogan, American composer
 Jed Johnson, Andy Warhol's partner of twelve years, interior designer, and director
 Pam Lychner, American crime victims' rights advocate and former TWA flight attendant
 Rico Puhlmann, German fashion photographer
 Courtney Elizabeth Johns, sister of Geoff Johns and the inspiration for the DC Comics superhero Courtney Whitmore
 Ana Marie Shorter, Wayne Shorter's second wife

In addition, 16 students and five adult chaperones from the French Club of the Montoursville Area High School in Pennsylvania were on board.

Initial investigation
The NTSB was notified about 8:50 pm the day of the accident; a full "go team" was assembled in Washington, DC, and arrived on scene early the next morning. Meanwhile, initial witness descriptions led many to believe the cause of the crash was a bomb or surface-to-air missile attack. Since the NTSB does not investigate criminal activity, the United States Attorney General is empowered to declare an investigation to be linked to a criminal act, and require the NTSB to relinquish control of the investigation to the FBI. In the case of TWA 800, the FBI initiated a parallel criminal investigation alongside the NTSB's accident investigation.

Search and recovery operations
Search and recovery operations were conducted by federal, state, and local agencies, as well as government contractors. An HH-60 Pave Hawk helicopter of the New York Air National Guard saw the explosion from about 8 miles away; it arrived at the scene of the explosion while debris was still in the process of falling into the water, forcing the crew to pull away. They reported their sighting to the tower at Suffolk County Airport. Remotely operated vehicles (ROVs), side-scan sonar, and laser line-scanning equipment were used to search for and investigate underwater debris fields. Victims and wreckage were recovered by scuba divers and ROVs; later scallop trawlers were used to recover wreckage embedded in the sea floor. In one of the largest diver-assisted salvage operations ever conducted, often working in very difficult and dangerous conditions, over 95% of the airplane wreckage was eventually recovered. The search and recovery effort identified three main areas of wreckage underwater; the yellow zone, red zone, and green zone contained wreckage from front, center, and rear sections of the airplane, respectively. The green zone with the aft portion of the aircraft was located the furthest along the flight path.

Pieces of wreckage were transported by boat to shore and then by truck to leased hangar space at the former Grumman Aircraft facility in Calverton, New York, for storage, examination, and reconstruction. This facility became the command center and headquarters for the investigation. NTSB and FBI personnel were present to observe all transfers to preserve the evidentiary value of the wreckage. The cockpit voice recorder and flight data recorder were recovered by U.S. Navy divers one week after the accident; they were immediately shipped to the NTSB laboratory in Washington, DC, for readout. The victims' remains were transported to the Suffolk County Medical Examiner's Office in Hauppauge, New York.

Tensions in the investigation
Relatives of TWA 800 passengers and crew, as well as the media, gathered at the Ramada Plaza JFK Hotel. Many waited until the remains of their family members had been recovered, identified, and released. This hotel became known as the "Heartbreak Hotel" for its role in handling families of victims of several airliner crashes.

Grief turned to anger at TWA's delay in confirming the passenger list, conflicting information from agencies and officials, and mistrust of the recovery operation's priorities. Although NTSB Vice Chairman Robert Francis stated that all bodies were being retrieved as soon as they were spotted, and that wreckage was being recovered only if divers believed that victims were hidden underneath, many families were suspicious that investigators were not being truthful, or withholding information.

Much anger and political pressure was also directed at Suffolk County Medical Examiner Dr. Charles V. Wetli, as recovered bodies backlogged at the morgue. Under constant and considerable pressure to identify victims with minimal delay, pathologists worked nonstop. While some victims' bodies were mostly intact, most were either burned, fragmented, skeletonized, or decaying, so they had to be identified by DNA testing and dental records. Since the primary objective was to identify all remains rather than performing a detailed forensic autopsy, the thoroughness of the examinations was highly variable. Ultimately, remains of all 230 victims were recovered and identified, the last over 10 months after the crash.

With lines of authority unclear, differences in agendas and culture between the FBI and NTSB resulted in discord. The FBI, from the start assuming that a criminal act had occurred, saw the NTSB as indecisive. Expressing frustration at the NTSB's unwillingness to speculate on a cause, one FBI agent described the NTSB as "No opinions. No nothing." Meanwhile, the NTSB was required to refute or play down speculation about conclusions and evidence, frequently supplied to reporters by law enforcement officials and politicians. The International Association of Machinists and Aerospace Workers, an invited party to the NTSB investigation, criticized the undocumented removal by FBI agents of wreckage from the hangar where it was stored.

Witness interviews

Although considerable discrepancies existed between different accounts, most witnesses to the accident had seen a "streak of light" that was described by 38 of 258 witnesses as ascending, moving to a point where a large fireball appeared, with several witnesses reporting that the fireball split in two as it descended toward the water. Intense public interest arose in these witness reports, as did much speculation that the reported streak of light was a missile that had struck TWA 800, causing the airplane to explode. These witness accounts were a major reason for the initiation and duration of the FBI's criminal investigation.

Around 80 FBI agents conducted interviews with potential witnesses daily. No verbatim records of the witness interviews were produced; instead, the agents who conducted the interviews wrote summaries that they then submitted. Witnesses were not asked to review or correct the summaries. Included in some of the witness summaries were drawings or diagrams of what the witness observed.

Within days of the crash, the NTSB announced its intent to form its own witness group and to interview witnesses to the crash. After the FBI raised concerns about nongovernmental parties in the NTSB's investigation having access to this information and possible prosecutorial difficulties resulting from multiple interviews of the same witness, the NTSB deferred and did not interview witnesses to the crash. A safety board investigator later reviewed FBI interview notes and briefed other board investigators on their contents. In November 1996, the FBI agreed to allow the NTSB access to summaries of witness accounts in which personally identifying information had been redacted and to conduct a limited number of witness interviews. In April 1998, the FBI provided the NTSB with the identities of the witnesses, but due to the time elapsed, a decision was made to rely on the original FBI documents rather than reinterview witnesses.

Further investigation and analysis
Examination of the cockpit voice recorder (CVR) and flight data recorder data showed a normal takeoff and climb, with the aircraft in normal flight before both abruptly stopped at 8:31:12 pm. At 8:29:15 pm, Captain Kevorkian was heard to say, "Look at that crazy fuel flow indicator there on number four... see that?" A loud noise recorded on the last few tenths of a second of the CVR was similar to the last noises recorded from other airplanes that had experienced in-flight breakups. This, together with the distribution of wreckage and witness reports, all indicated a sudden catastrophic in-flight breakup of TWA 800.

Possible causes of the in-flight breakup
Investigators considered several possible causes for the structural breakup - structural failure and decompression, detonation of a high-energy explosive device, such as a missile warhead exploding either upon impact with the airplane, or just before impact, a bomb exploding inside the airplane, or a fuel-air explosion in the center wing fuel tank.

Structural failure and decompression
Close examination of the wreckage revealed no evidence of structural faults such as fatigue, corrosion, or mechanical damage that could have caused the in-flight breakup. The breakup also could have been initiated by an in-flight separation of the forward cargo door like the disasters on board Turkish Airlines Flight 981 or United Airlines Flight 811, but all evidence indicated that the door was closed and locked at impact. The NTSB concluded that "the in-flight breakup of TWA flight 800 was not initiated by a pre-existing condition resulting in a structural failure and decompression."

Missile or bomb detonation
A review of recorded data from long-range and airport surveillance radars revealed multiple contacts of airplanes or objects in TWA 800's vicinity at the time of the accident. None of these contacts intersected TWA 800's position at any time. Attention was drawn to data from the Islip, New York, ARTCC facility that showed three tracks in the vicinity of TWA 800 that did not appear in any of the other radar data. None of these sequences intersected TWA 800's position at any time, either. All the reviewed radar data showed no radar returns consistent with a missile or other projectile traveling toward TWA 800.

Military records examined by the NTSB showed no military surface vessels within  of TWA 800 at the time of the accident.

The NTSB reviewed the 30-knot target track to try to determine why it did not divert from its course and proceed to the area where the TWA 800 wreckage had fallen. TWA 800 was behind the target, and with the likely forward-looking perspective of the target's occupant(s), the occupants would not have been in a position to observe the aircraft's breakup or subsequent explosions or fireball(s). Additionally, the occupants of the target track were unlikely to have been able to hear the explosions over the sound of its engines and the noise of the hull traveling through water, even more so if the occupants were in an enclosed bridge or cabin. Further, review of the Islip radar data for other similar summer days and nights in 1999 indicated that the 30-knot track was consistent with normal commercial fishing, recreational, and cargo vessel traffic.

Trace amounts of explosive residue were detected on three samples of material from three separate locations of the recovered airplane wreckage (described by the FBI as a piece of canvas-like material and two pieces of a floor panel). These samples were submitted to the FBI's laboratory in Washington, DC, which determined that one sample contained traces of cyclotrimethylenetrinitramine (RDX), another nitroglycerin, and the third a combination of RDX and pentaerythritol tetranitrate (PETN); these findings received much media attention at the time. In addition, the backs of several damaged passenger seats were observed to have an unknown red/brown-shaded substance on them. According to the seat manufacturer, the locations and appearance of this substance were consistent with adhesive used in the construction of the seats, and additional laboratory testing by NASA identified the substance as being consistent with adhesives.

Further examination of the airplane structure, seats, and other interior components found no damage typically associated with a high-energy explosion of a bomb or missile warhead ("severe pitting, cratering, petalling, or hot-gas washing"). This included the pieces on which trace amounts of explosives were found. Of the 5% of the fuselage that was not recovered, none of the missing areas was large enough to have covered all the damage that would have been caused by the detonation of a bomb or missile. None of the victims' remains showed any evidence of injuries that could have been caused by high-energy explosives.

The NTSB considered the possibility that the explosive residue was due to contamination from the aircraft's use in 1991 transporting troops during the Gulf War or its use in a dog-training explosive detection exercise about one month before the accident. Testing conducted by the FAA's Technical Center indicated that residues of the type of explosives found on the wreckage would dissipate completely after two days of immersion in sea water (almost all recovered wreckage was immersed longer than two days). The NTSB concluded that it was "quite possible" that the explosive residue detected was transferred from military ships or ground vehicles, or the clothing and boots of military personnel, onto the wreckage during or after the recovery operation and was not present when the aircraft crashed into the water.

Although it was unable to determine the exact source of the trace amounts of explosive residue found on the wreckage, the lack of any other corroborating evidence associated with a high-energy explosion led the NTSB to conclude, "the in-flight breakup of TWA flight 800 was not initiated by a bomb or missile strike."

Fuel-air explosion in the center wing fuel tank

To evaluate the sequence of structural breakup of the airplane, the NTSB formed the Sequencing Group, which examined individual pieces of the recovered structure, two-dimensional reconstructions or layouts of sections of the airplane, and various-sized three-dimensional reconstructions of portions of the airplane. In addition, the locations of pieces of wreckage at the time of recovery and differences in fire effects on pieces that are normally adjacent to each other were evaluated. The Sequencing Group concluded that the first event in the breakup sequence was a fracture in the wing center section of the aircraft, caused by an "overpressure event" in the center wing fuel tank (CWT). An overpressure event was defined as a rapid increase in pressure resulting in failure of the structure of the CWT.

Because no evidence was found that an explosive device detonated in this (or any other) area of the airplane, this overpressure event could only have been caused by a fuel-air explosion in the CWT. A major reason for the flammability of the fuel-air vapor in the CWT of the 747 was the large amount of heat generated and transferred to the CWT by air conditioning packs located directly below the tank; with the CWT temperature raised to a sufficient level, a single ignition source could cause an explosion.

Computer modeling and scale-model testing were used to predict and demonstrate how an explosion would progress in a 747 CWT. During this time, quenching was identified as an issue, where the explosion would extinguish itself as it passed through the complex structure of the CWT. Because the research data regarding quenching were limited, a complete understanding of quenching behavior was not possible, and the issue of quenching remained unresolved.

To better determine whether a fuel-air vapor explosion in the CWT would generate sufficient pressure to break apart the fuel tank and lead to the destruction of the airplane, tests were conducted in July and August 1997, using a retired Air France 747 at Bruntingthorpe Airfield, England. These tests simulated a fuel-air explosion in the CWT by igniting a propane-air mixture; this resulted in the failure of the tank structure due to overpressure. While the NTSB acknowledged that the test conditions at Bruntingthorpe were not fully comparable to the conditions that existed on TWA 800 at the time of the accident, previous fuel explosions in the CWTs of commercial airliners such as Avianca Flight 203 and Philippine Airlines Flight 143 confirmed that a CWT explosion could break apart the fuel tank and lead to the destruction of an airplane.

Ultimately, based on "the accident airplane's breakup sequence; wreckage damage characteristics; scientific tests and research on fuels, fuel tank explosions, and the conditions in the CWT at the time of the accident; and analysis of witness information," the NTSB concluded that "the TWA flight 800 in-flight breakup was initiated by a fuel/air explosion in the CWT."

In-flight breakup sequence and crippled flight

Recovery locations of the wreckage from the ocean (the red, yellow, and green zones) clearly indicated: (1) the red area pieces (from the forward portion of the wing center section and a ring of fuselage directly in front) were the earliest pieces to separate from the airplane; (2) the forward fuselage section departed simultaneously with or shortly after the red area pieces, landing relatively intact in the yellow zone; (3) the green area pieces (wings and the aft portion of the fuselage) remained intact for a period after the separation of the forward fuselage, and impacted the water in the green zone.

Fire damage and soot deposits on the recovered wreckage indicated that some areas of fire existed on the airplane as it continued in crippled flight after the loss of the forward fuselage. After about 34 seconds (based on information from witness documents), the outer portions of both the right and left wings failed. Shortly after, the left wing separated from what remained of the main fuselage, which resulted in further development of the fuel-fed fireballs as the pieces of wreckage fell to the ocean.

Only the FAA radar facility in North Truro, Massachusetts, using specialized processing software from the United States Air Force 84th Radar Evaluation Squadron, was capable of estimating the altitude of TWA 800 after it lost power due to the CWT explosion. Because of accuracy limitations, these radar data could not be used to determine whether the aircraft climbed after the nose separated. Instead, the NTSB conducted a series of computer simulations to examine the flightpath of the main portion of the fuselage. Hundreds of simulations were run using various combinations of possible times the nose of TWA 800 separated (the exact time was unknown), different models of the behavior of the crippled aircraft (the aerodynamic properties of the aircraft without its nose could only be estimated), and longitudinal radar data (the recorded radar tracks of the east/west position of TWA 800 from various sites differed).

Analysis of reported witness observations

At the start of FBI's investigation, because of the possibility that international terrorists might have been involved, assistance was requested from the Central Intelligence Agency (CIA). CIA analysts, relying on sound-propagation analysis, concluded that the witnesses could not be describing a missile approaching an intact aircraft, but were seeing a trail of burning fuel coming from the aircraft after the initial explosion. This conclusion was reached after calculating how long the sound of the initial explosion took to reach the witnesses, and using that to correlate the witness observations with the accident sequence. In all cases, the witnesses could not be describing a missile approaching an intact aircraft, as the plane had already exploded before their observations began.

As the investigation progressed, the NTSB decided to form a witness group to more fully address the accounts of witnesses. From November 1996 through April 1997, this group reviewed summaries of witness accounts on loan from the FBI (with personal information redacted), and conducted interviews with crewmembers from a New York Air National Guard HH-60 helicopter and C-130 airplane, as well as a U.S. Navy P-3 airplane that was flying in the vicinity of TWA 800 at the time of the accident.

In February 1998, the FBI, having closed its active investigation, agreed to fully release the witness summaries to the NTSB. With access to these documents no longer controlled by the FBI, the NTSB formed a second witness group to review the documents. Because of time that had elapsed (about 21 months) before the NTSB received information about the identity of the witnesses, the witness group chose not to reinterview the witnesses, but instead to rely on the original summaries of witness statements written by FBI agents as the best available evidence of the observations initially reported by the witnesses. Despite the two and a half years that had elapsed since the accident, the witness group did interview the captain of Eastwind Airlines Flight 507, who was the first to report the explosion of TWA 800, because of his vantage point and experience as an airline pilot.

The NTSB's review of the released witness documents determined that they contained 736 witness accounts, of which 258 were characterized as "streak of light" witnesses ("an object moving in the sky... variously described [as] a point of light, fireworks, a flare, a shooting star, or something similar.") The NTSB witness group concluded that the streak of light reported by witnesses might have been the actual airplane during some stage of its flight before the fireball developed, noting that most of the 258 streak-of-light accounts were generally consistent with the calculated flightpath of the accident airplane after the CWT explosion.

Thirty-eight witnesses described a streak of light that ascended vertically, or nearly so, and these accounts "seem[ed] to be inconsistent with the accident airplane's flightpath." In addition, 18 witnesses reported seeing a streak of light that originated at the surface, or the horizon, which did not "appear to be consistent with the airplane's calculated flightpath and other known aspects of the accident sequence." Regarding these differing accounts, the NTSB noted that based on their experience in previous investigations "witness reports are often inconsistent with the known facts or with other witnesses' reports of the same events." The interviews conducted by the FBI focused on the possibility of a missile attack; suggested interview questions given to FBI agents such as "Where was the sun in relation to the aircraft and the missile launch point?" and "How long did the missile fly?" could have biased interviewees' responses in some cases. The NTSB concluded that given the large number of witnesses in this case, they "did not expect all of the documented witness observations to be consistent with one another" and "did not view these apparently anomalous witness reports as persuasive evidence that some witnesses might have observed a missile."

After missile visibility tests were conducted in April 2000, at Eglin Air Force Base, Fort Walton Beach, Florida, the NTSB determined that if witnesses had observed a missile attack, they would have seen:
 a light from the burning missile motor ascending very rapidly and steeply for about 8 seconds
 the light disappearing for up to 7 seconds
 upon the missile striking the aircraft and igniting the CWT, another light, moving considerably more slowly and more laterally than the first, for about 30 seconds
 this light descending while simultaneously developing into a fireball falling toward the ocean None of the witness documents described such a scenario.

Because of their unique vantage points or the level of precision and detail provided in their accounts, five witness accounts generated special interest: the pilot of Eastwind Airlines Flight 507, the crew members in the HH-60 helicopter, a streak-of-light witness aboard US Airways Flight 217, a land witness on the Beach Lane Bridge in Westhampton Beach, New York, and a witness on a boat near Great Gun Beach. Advocates of a missile-attack scenario asserted that some of these witnesses observed a missile; analysis demonstrated that the observations were not consistent with a missile attack on TWA 800, but instead were consistent with these witnesses having observed part of the in-flight fire and breakup sequence after the CWT explosion.

The NTSB concluded, "the witness observations of a streak of light were not related to a missile and that the streak of light reported by most of these witnesses was burning fuel from the accident airplane in crippled flight during some portion of the postexplosion, preimpact breakup sequence". The NTSB further concluded, "the witnesses' observations of one or more fireballs were of the airplane's burning wreckage falling toward the ocean".

Possible ignition sources of the center wing fuel tank
To determine what ignited the flammable fuel-air vapor in the CWT and caused the explosion, the NTSB evaluated numerous potential ignition sources. All but one were considered very unlikely to have been the source of ignition.

Missile fragment or small explosive charge
Although the NTSB had already reached the conclusion that a missile strike did not cause the structural failure of the airplane, the possibility that a missile could have exploded close enough to TWA 800 for a missile fragment to have entered the CWT and ignited the fuel/air vapor, yet far enough away not to have left any damage characteristic of a missile strike, was considered. Computer simulations using missile performance data simulated a missile detonating in a location such that a fragment from the warhead could penetrate the CWT. Based on these simulations, the NTSB concluded that it was "very unlikely" that a warhead could have detonated in such a location where a fragment could penetrate the CWT without other missile fragments impacting the surrounding airplane structure, leaving distinctive impact marks.

Similarly, the investigation considered the possibility that a small explosive charge placed on the CWT could have been the ignition source. Testing by the NTSB and the British Defence Evaluation and Research Agency demonstrated that when metal of the same type and thickness of the CWT was penetrated by a small charge, petalling of the surface occurred where the charge was placed, with pitting on the adjacent surfaces, and visible hot-gas washing damage in the surrounding area. Since none of the recovered CWT wreckage exhibited these damage characteristics, and none of the areas of missing wreckage was large enough to encompass all the expected damage, the investigation concluded that this scenario was "very unlikely".

Other potential sources
The NTSB also investigated whether the fuel-air mixture in the CWT could have been ignited by lightning strike, meteor strike, auto ignition or hot surface ignition, a fire migrating to the CWT from another fuel tank via the vent system, an uncontained engine failure, a turbine burst in the air conditioning packs beneath the CWT, a malfunctioning CWT jettison/override pump, a malfunctioning CWT scavenger pump, or static electricity. After analysis, the investigation determined that these potential sources were "very unlikely" to have been the source of ignition.

Fuel quantity indication system
Because a combustible fuel-air mixture will always exist in fuel tanks, Boeing designers had attempted to eliminate all possible sources of ignition in the 747's tanks. To do so, all devices are protected from vapor intrusion, and voltages and currents used by the fuel quantity indication system (FQIS) are kept very low. In the case of the 747-100 series, the only wiring located inside the CWT is that associated with the FQIS.

For the FQIS to have been Flight 800's ignition source, a transfer of higher-than-normal voltage to the FQIS would have needed to occur, as well as some mechanism whereby the excess energy was released by the FQIS wiring into the CWT. The NTSB concluded, "the ignition energy for the CWT explosion most likely entered the CWT through the FQIS wiring."

Though the FQIS itself was designed to prevent danger by minimizing voltages and currents, the innermost tube of Flight 800's FQIS compensator showed damage similar to that of the compensator tube identified as the ignition source for the surge tank fire that destroyed a 747 near Madrid in 1976. This was not considered proof of a source of ignition. Evidence of arcing was found in a wire bundle that included FQIS wiring connecting to the center wing tank. Arcing signs were also seen on two wires sharing a cable raceway with FQIS wiring at station 955.

The captain's CVR channel showed two "dropouts" of background power harmonics in the second before the recording ended (with the separation of the nose). This might well be the signature of an arc on cockpit wiring adjacent to the FQIS wiring. The captain commented on the "crazy" readings of the number 4 engine fuel flow gauge about 2 1/2 minutes before the CVR recording ended. Finally, the CWT fuel quantity gauge was recovered and indicated 640 pounds instead of the 300 pounds that had been loaded into that tank. Experiments showed that applying power to a wire leading to the fuel quantity gauge can cause the digital display to change by several hundred pounds before the circuit breaker trips. Thus, the gauge anomaly could have been caused by a short to the FQIS wiring. The NTSB concluded that the most likely source of sufficient voltage to cause ignition was a short from damaged wiring, or within electrical components of the FQIS. As not all components and wiring were recovered, pinpointing the source of the necessary voltage was not possible.

Report conclusions
The NTSB investigation ended with the adoption of the board's final report on August 23, 2000. The board determined that the probable cause of the TWA 800 accident was:

In addition to the probable cause, the NTSB found the following contributing factors to the accident:

During the course of its investigation, and in its final report, the NTSB issued 15 safety recommendations, mostly covering fuel tank and wiring-related issues. Among the recommendations was that significant consideration should be given to the development of modifications such as nitrogen-inerting systems for new airplane designs, and where feasible, for existing airplanes.

Controversy

The NTSB's conclusions about the cause of the TWA 800 disaster took four years and one month to be published. The FBI's earliest investigations and interviews, later used by the NTSB, were performed under the assumption of a missile attack, a fact noted in the NTSB's final report. Six months into the investigation, the NTSB's chairman, Jim Hall, was quoted as saying, "All three theories—a bomb, a missile, or mechanical failure—remain." Speculation was fueled in part by early descriptions, visuals, and eyewitness accounts of the disaster that indicated a sudden explosion and trails of fire moving in an upward direction.

On June 19, 2013, the NTSB acknowledged in a press release that they received a petition for reconsideration of its investigation into the July 17, 1996, crash of TWA Flight 800. In 2014, the NTSB declined the petition to reopen the investigation. In a press release, the NTSB stated: "After a thorough review of all the information provided by the petitioners, the NTSB denied the petition in its entirety because the evidence and analysis presented did not show the original findings were incorrect."

Aftermath

Many internet users responded to the incident; the resulting web traffic set records for internet activity at the time. CNN's traffic quadrupled to 3.9 million views per day. The website of The New York Times had its traffic increase to 1.5 million views per day, 50% higher than its previous rate. In 1996, few U.S. government websites were updated daily, but the United States Navy's crash website was constantly updated and had detailed information about the salvage of the crash site.

The wreckage was moved to an NTSB facility in Ashburn, Virginia, that was custom-built for the purpose. The reconstructed aircraft was used to train accident investigators until it was decommissioned in 2021.

On July 18, 2008, the U.S secretary of transportation visited the facility and announced a final rule designed to prevent accidents caused by fuel-tank explosions. The rule required airlines to pump inert gas into the tanks. The rule covered the CWT on all new passenger and cargo airliners, and passenger planes built in most of the 1990s, but not old cargo planes. The NTSB had first recommended such a rule just five months after the incident and 33 years after a similar recommendation issued by the Civil Aeronautics Board Bureau of Safety on December 17, 1963, nine days after the crash of Pan Am Flight 214.

The crash of TWA Flight 800, and that of ValuJet Flight 592 earlier in 1996, prompted Congress to pass the Aviation Disaster Family Assistance Act of 1996 as part of the federal aviation appropriations bill. Among other things, the act gives NTSB, instead of the particular airline involved, responsibility for coordinating services to the families of victims of fatal aircraft accidents in the United States. In addition, it restricts lawyers and other parties from contacting family members within 30 days of the accident.

During the investigation, the NTSB and the FBI clashed with each other. The agencies lacked a detailed protocol describing which agency should take the lead when whether an event was an accident or a criminal act was initially unclear. At the time of the crash, 49 CFR 831.5 specified that the NTSB's aviation accident investigations have priority over all other federal investigations. After the TWA flight 800 investigation, the NTSB recognized the need for better clarity.  to clarify the issue in 49 USC 1131(a)(2)(B), which was amended in 2000 to read: 
In 2005, the NTSB and the FBI entered into a memorandum of understanding (MOU) that states that, "[i]n the immediate aftermath of a transportation accident, the NTSB is the presumptive lead investigative agency and will assume control of the accident scene." The FBI may still conduct a criminal investigation, but the NTSB investigation has priority. When investigative priority remains with the NTSB, the FBI must coordinate its investigative activities with the NTSB investigator-in-charge. This authority includes interviewing witnesses. The MOU states that: “[t]his procedure is intended…to ensure that neither NTSB nor FBI investigative activity unnecessarily complicates or compromises the other agency’s investigation. The new statutory language and the MOU have improved coordination between the NTSB and FBI since the TWA flight 800 accident. , NTSB and FBI personnel conduct joint exercises. Each agency can call upon the other's laboratories and other assets. The NTSB and the FBI have designated liaisons to ensure that information flows between agencies, and to coordinate on-scene operations.

Heidi Snow, the fiancée of Flight 800 victim Michel Breistroff, established the AirCraft Casualty Emotional Support Services nonprofit group together with families of victims of Pan Am Flight 103.

Memorials

The TWA Flight 800 International Memorial was dedicated in a  parcel immediately adjoining the main pavilion at Smith Point County Park in Shirley, New York, on July 14, 2004. Funds for the memorial were raised by the Families of TWA Flight 800 Association. The memorial includes landscaped grounds, flags from the 13 countries of the victims, and a curved Cambrian Black granite memorial with the names engraved on one side and an illustration on the other of a wave releasing 230 seagulls. In July 2006, an abstract black granite statue of a  lighthouse was added above a tomb holding many of the victims' personal belongings. The lighthouse statue was designed by Harry Edward Seaman, whose cousin died in the crash, and dedicated by George Pataki.

Destruction of wreckage
For almost 25 years, the wreckage of Flight 800 was kept by the NTSB and used as an accident-investigation teaching aid. By 2021, the methods taught using the wreckage were determined to no longer be relevant to modern accident investigation, which by then relied heavily on new technology, including three-dimensional laser-scanning techniques. The NTSB did not wish to renew the lease on the hangar it was using to store the reassembled accident debris, and decided it should be disposed of. Accordingly, the NTSB decommissioned the wreckage in July 2021. As the NTSB had agreements with the victims' families that the wreckage cannot be used in any kind of public memorial or be scuttled in the ocean, it plans to scan each piece of debris with a three-dimensional laser scanner, with the data being permanently archived, after which the wreckage will be destroyed and the metal recycled. Any parts of the plane that cannot be recycled will be disposed of in landfills. Destruction of the wreckage was scheduled for completion before the end of 2021.

See also 
 Boeing 747 hull losses
 Louis Freeh – director of the FBI from 1993 to 2001 who assisted in the crash investigation
 Night Fall – 2004 New York Times best-seller by novelist Nelson DeMille that revolves around a couple who witnessed and videotaped the crash of TWA Flight 800
 Pan Am Flight 214 – an aircraft that suffered a fuel-tank explosion in midair in 1963 after being hit by lightning
 Philippine Airlines Flight 143 – a similar incident in 1990 involving a 737 that experienced a fuel-tank explosion on the ground, possibly caused by faulty wiring
 Thai Airways International Flight 114 - a similar incident in 2001 involving a 737 that experienced a fuel-tank explosion on the ground, possibly as a result of running the pump in the presence of metal shavings and a fuel/air mixture
 South African Airways Flight 295 – another Boeing 747 crash giving rise to conspiracy theories
 Courtney Whitmore – a DC Comics character based on the disaster's victim Courtney Elizabeth Johns; the younger sister of Geoff Johns

Notes

References

External links

 National Transportation Safety Board
 NTSB Aircraft Accident Report
 NTSB Aircraft Accident Report Appendices
 TWA 800 Board Meeting (Archive)
 Report by John Barry Smith (Archive), posted on NTSB website
 CIA analysis of witness observations 
 TWA Flight 800: United States Navy (Archive)
 Trans World Airlines Flight 800: Federal Bureau of Investigation New York Field Office (Archive)
 Boeing Statement Following the First Day of the NTSB's Flight 800 Sunshine Meeting (Archive) – Boeing
 Learning from a Tragedy: Explosions and Flight 800
 CNN portal: TWA Flight 800
 "Passenger List: TWA Flight 800". The Washington Post. 
 
 

1996 in New York (state)
Death in New York (state)
July 1996 events in the United States
TWA Flight 800
John F. Kennedy International Airport